Cassa di Risparmio della Marca Trivigiana also known as Cassamarca in short, was an Italian savings bank headquartered in Treviso, Veneto. The S.p.A. and the banking foundation were the founders of banking group Unicredito in 1994, a predecessor of UniCredit. The S.p.A. was absorbed into UniCredit in 2002; the banking foundation, survived as a charity organization (as of 2017), as well as owned 0.23% shares of UniCredit (as of 31 December 2016), as one of its investments.

The history of the bank could also traced to 1496, which the founder and predecessor of the bank, Monte di Pietà di Treviso, was founded. The Monte was merged into the bank in 1942 after a 3 decades of split.

Predecessors

Monte di Pietà di Treviso
Monte di Pietà di Treviso was a mount of piety founded in 1496, by Franciscan Domenico da Ponzone in the Republic of Venice, 34 years after the first recorded mount of Italy was founded in Perugia, by other Franciscans, Bernardine of Feltre and Michele Carcano, in the Papal States. In 1822 the mount founded the savings bank of Treviso and again in 1907. After twice spin off, the mount was merged back to the savings bank in 1942. The mount was also known as  Monte di Credito su Pegno di Treviso since 1935.

The building of the mount contained several decoration and wall painting by various artists, such as Lodewijk Toeput.

Cassa di Risparmio di Treviso
The first savings bank of the city was founded by the local mount of piety in 1822, at that time still part of the Kingdom of Lombardy–Venetia of the Austrian Empire. Similar savings bank was also founded in other cities of modern Veneto region (as well as in Lombardy) by the Austrian government, such as Venice, Verona, Vicenza, Rovigo and Padua in the 1820s. The savings bank of Vienna, in the capital of the Empire, was founded in 1819.

After the unification of Italy, in 1866, the savings bank gained its independent status, but affiliated to Cassa di Risparmio delle Provincie Lombarde (Cariplo; known as Cassa di Risparmio di Lombardia at that time) in 1868. The assets and liabilities were transferred to Treviso branch in 1872, as a fulfillment of the decree-law in 1868.

History

Cassa di Risparmio della Marca Trivigiana
The savings bank of Treviso was re-established by the mount in 1907 as Banco dei Depositi a Risparmio del Monte di Pietà di Treviso; it was separated from the mount in 1913 as Cassa di Risparmio della Marca Trivigiana. Marca Trivigiana was the ancient name of the area around Treviso.

In 1928, due to the royal decree-law No.269 of 1927, (law no.2587 of 1927) the savings bank acquired fellow savings bank Cassa di Risparmio di Castelfranco Veneto, as the law promoted merger of savings banks that under a threshold of size. In 1938 Banca Popolare di Asolo was also acquired. The local mount of piety of Treviso was also merged with the savings bank in 1942 (during the World War II), along with counterpart in the comuni of Asolo in 1941, Castelfranco Veneto in 1942 and Vittorio Veneto in 1949 after the war.

A report by Mediobanca, shown the bank was ranked 74th by total assets in 1988, among all type of commercial banks.

Cassamarca S.p.A.

At first the bank (Cassamarca S.p.A.) had a share capital of 270 billion lire, excluding share premium.

The law also started a merger and acquisition of the banking sector of Italy, especially the eventual birth of several banking group, especially in Veneto region as UniCredit, Banca Intesa, Sanpaolo IMI, Banco Popolare di Verona e Novara, Banca Antonveneta, Banca Popolare di Vicenza and Veneto Banca. However, the consolidation also saw the retirement of the brand Cassamarca as a bank.

A further amendment of laws in 1994, making directors of the foundation, cannot be a member the board of the bank that the foundation controlled; Dino De Poli, chairman of Cassamarca at that time, was temporarily allowed to remain in both of the boards, as the law also allowed banks that were merging with other banks, to do so. In the same year, Cassamarca formed a new banking group Unicredito with fellow Veneto savings bank Cariverona Banca S.p.A.; Fondazione Cariverona was the largest shareholder of the new banking group. The proposed merger was announced in 1993. In 1995, Cariverona formed an alliance with Cassa di Risparmio di Torino (Banca CRT), both banks were the leading savings bank of Italy according to Mediobanca's report in 1989. Their competitors Cariplo, was located in Lombardy region. Uncredito's competitors: the rest of the savings bank of Veneto merged to form Casse Venete Banca in 1994.

According to the Bank of Italy figures, in term of market share in deposit, before the merger of Cariverona (Cassa di Risparmio di Verona, Vicenza, Belluno e Ancona), and Cassamarca, they also had a significant market share in their home province(s). For Cassamarca, it was 24.59% in the Province of Treviso in 1994.

A minority stake of Slovak bank Pol'nobanka and Bosnian Croats bank Hrvatska Banka Mostar, were acquired by Cassamarca in 1995 and 1997, according to the company.

In 1997 Banca CRT formally joined Unicredito and in the next year Unicredito merged with Credito Italiano to form UniCredito Italiano (now known as UniCredit). De Poli remained as the chairman of Cassamarca after the merger; he was replaced by Antonio Romano in October 2000, former chairman of Treviso's Chamber of Commerce.

Cassamarca S.p.A. survived as a subsidiary of the banking group until 2002, which 7 sub-brands of UniCredito Italiano were merged to form UniCredit Banca, as well as other divisions of the banking group, such as UniCredit Banca d'Impresa. , the former direct owner of Cassamarca S.p.A., the Fondazione Cassamarca, owned 2.801% share capital of UniCredito Italiano as the indirect minority owner of Cassamarca S.p.A.; immediately after the merger in 1998, the foundation owned 3.79% share capital of UniCredito Italiano.

Equity investments

 The Bank of Italy (0.06%)
 Cariverona Ireland (25%)
 Interporto di Venezia (35.14%)
 Veneto Sviluppo (3.75%)

Banking foundation

Fondazione Cassa di Risparmio della Marca Trivigiana or Cassamarca Foundation, is a banking foundation which succeed the bank as a charity organization. , the foundation had an equity of €494 million. It also owned 0.23% shares of UniCredit, or 13,963,410 number of shares before 2017 reverse stock split of the bank. The foundation did not write-down the value of the shares of UniCredit, but other foundation did, such as Fondazione CRTrieste, to reflect the market value of the shares. The net loss of the foundation, was also questioned by the Ministry of Economy and Finance.

His term was most recently confirmed in 2016, until 2018 and 2020 respectively.

It was reported that De Poli received €10 million as wage from 1992 to 2017 from the foundation. As part of a reform led by Associazione di Fondazioni e di Casse di Risparmio S.p.A. (ACRI) and the Ministry of Economy and Finance, a new articles of association of the organization was approved in 2016. Some of the member of the Consiglio di Indirizzo e di Programmazione would be elected by the mayor and university professor from Treviso area, which the foundation was obligated to support the area around Treviso. In December 2016, professor  was confirmed as the vice-chairman of the aforementioned board. Some member were also professor, such as Luca Antonini and Ferruccio Bresolin. Local politicians, Giovanni Squizzato and Ubaldo Fanton were also the members of that board.

The foundation is one of the 86 member banking foundations of the ACRI.

In the past, the foundation also purchased  and the adjacent barrack, as a campus for Ca' Foscari University of Venice and the University of Padua. Ca' Foscari and the foundation also had a dispute on the payment of the salary of the staff of the Treviso campus, which the campus was supported by the foundation. The foundation also established the Australasian Centre for Italian Studies (ACIS) with the University of Western Australia in 2002.

The foundation also signed a financial deal with Société Générale in order to subscribe the capital increase of UniCredit in 2012, in order to prevent the dilution of the ownership ratio of the foundation over the bank.

Subsidiaries
 Appiani 1: SPV for Area Appiani project
 Teatri e Umanesimo Latino: SPV for

Properties
 
 
 
 former Monte di Pietà di Treviso headquarters – re-acquired from UniCredit in 2004

Arts collection
located in the headquarters of the former mount of piety

Footnotes

See also
 Banca della Marca, a co-operative bank
 Centromarca Banca, a co-operative bank
 Banca di Treviso, a defunct bank that was acquired by Südtiroler Volksbank – Banca Popolare dell'Alto Adige
 Banca Popolare di Treviso, also known as Banca Popolare di Castelfranco Veneto, a defunct co-operative bank that was acquired by Banca Popolare di Vicenza
 Cassa di Risparmio del Veneto, fellow savings bank in Veneto, a subsidiary of Intesa Sanpaolo
 Cassa di Risparmio di Venezia, fellow savings bank in Veneto, a defunct subsidiary of Intesa Sanpaolo
 Cassa di Risparmio di Verona, Vicenza, Belluno e Ancona, formed Unicredito with Cassa di Risparmio della Marca Trivigiana
 Veneto Banca, a defunct co-operative bank headquartered in the Province of Treviso, also known as Banca Popolare di Asolo e Montebelluna and Banca Popolare di Montebelluna

References

Further reading

 Some posters of the bank pilotagreen.it

External links
  (currently redirect to UniCredit)
 Official website of Fondazione Cassamarca

Defunct banks of Italy
Companies based in Treviso
Former UniCredit subsidiaries
Banks established in 1822
Italian companies established in 1822
1822 establishments in the Austrian Empire
Re-established companies
Banks disestablished in 2002
Italian companies disestablished in 2002
Mounts of piety